Sanawan is a town in Kot Addu District of Punjab, Pakistan. .

See also
Sanawan railway station

Kot Addu District